Wieniawa is a Polish coat of arms. It was used by several noble, in Polish language szlachta families in the times of medieval Poland and the Polish–Lithuanian Commonwealth.

History 

The Wieniawa coat of arms originated from Moravia in the 11th century. First record is from 1382 (a seal).

Blazon 
English blazon: "Or, an ox head sable with a nose ring of the first in chief."

Notable bearers 
Notable bearers of this coat of arms include:

 Jerzy Białłozor
 Bolesław Wieniawa-Długoszowski
 House of Leszczyński
 Stanisław I Leszczyński
 Maria Leszczyńska 
 Bogusław Leszczyński 
 Rafał Leszczyński
 Jan Długosz historian
 Denis Zubrytsky (1777–1862), Ukrainian historian

Gallery
Variations

Cities and Villages

Other

See also

 Polish heraldry
 Heraldic family
 List of Polish nobility coats of arms

Bibliography
 Alfred Znamierowski: Herbarz rodowy. Warszawa: Świat Książki, 2004, s. 176. .
 Jan Długosz: Insignia seu Clenodia Regis et Regni Poloniae. Poznań: Zygmunt Celichowski, 1885, s. 20.
 Kasper Niesiecki, Herbarz, t. IX, s. 301-302
 Andrzej Kulikowski: Wielki herbarz rodów polskich. Warszawa: Świat Książki, 2005, s. 313. .
 Józef Szymański: Herbarz średniowiecznego rycerstwa polskiego. Warszawa: PWN, 1993, s. 289-291. .
 Tadeusz Gajl: Herbarz polski od średniowiecza do XX wieku : ponad 4500 herbów szlacheckich 37 tysięcy nazwisk 55 tysięcy rodów. L&L, 2007, s. 406-539. .
 Kasper Niesiecki, Herbarz, t. IX, s. 301-302
 Juliusz Karol Ostrowski: Ksiega herbowa rodów polskich. Warszawa: 1897.
 Sławomir Górzyński: Arystokracja polska w Galicji: studium heraldyczno-genealogiczne. Warszawa: DiG, 2009, s. 152-153. .

References

Wieniawa

Coats of arms with bison